The American Short Story is an American television anthology series produced by Learning in Focus and Sea Cliff Productions for the Public Broadcasting Service (PBS). It consisted of adaptations of short stories by both classic and contemporary American writers.

Robert Geller was the Executive Producer. Directors included Lamont Johnson, John Korty, Joan Micklin Silver, Ján Kadár, and Randa Haines. The series was hosted by Henry Fonda and Colleen Dewhurst. A total of 17 episodes aired on PBS from 1974 to 1980.

Episodes

References

The American Short Story Volume One, edited by Calvin Skaggs, published by Dell Publishing (1977) 
The American Short Story Volume Two, edited by Calvin Skaggs, published by Dell Publishing (1980) 

1974 American television series debuts
1980 American television series endings
1970s American anthology television series
1980s American anthology television series
1970s American drama television series
1980s American drama television series
English-language television shows
PBS original programming